This is a list of localities in Moldova inhabited by Romani people (in Romanian: romi, țigani), according to the data of 2004 Moldovan census.

References

!